"Threads of Silence" is a song by Australian singer songwriter, Karise Eden. The song was reeled as a digital download in Australia on 3 June 2013 peaked at number 19 on the ARIA Singles Charts. Eden performed the song live on The Voice Australia on the day of release.

Track listing
Digital download
"Threads of Silence" – 3:58

Charts

Release history

References

2013 singles
Karise Eden songs
2013 songs
Universal Records singles